The Treasury of St. Vitus Cathedral is a collection of ecclesiastical treasures of the Prague Cathedral and is in the property of Prague Cathedral Chapter. It is the largest church treasury in the Czech Republic and one of the most extensive in Europe. The Treasure contains more than 400 items, 139 from them have been displayed since 2012 in a new exhibition in the Chapel of the Holy Rood in Prague Castle.

The Treasury includes many holy relics and reliquaries. Famous are the Sword of Saint Wenceslas or Coronation Cross of Bohemia. One of the oldest items in the Treasury is a relic of the arm of Saint Vitus, acquired by Czech Duke Wenceslas (Saint) in 929 from German king Henry the Fowler. Duke Wenceslas built a new church to preserve this relic in honor of Saint Vitus – today St. Vitus Cathedral. The Cathedral and its treasury was richly donated by many rulers, e. g. by Emperor Charles IV or King Vladislaus II.

Gallery

References

External links 

Prague Castle
Museums in Prague
Decorative arts museums
Religious museums in the Czech Republic
Treasure of the Czech Republic
Jewellery museums
Church treasuries